Infanta Maria Theresa of Portugal (24 August 1855 – 12 February 1944) was a Princess of the House of Braganza. She became by marriage an Archduchess of Austria and also sister-in-law of Emperors Franz Joseph I of Austria and Maximilian I of Mexico, as well as step-grandmother of Emperor Charles I of Austria.

Early life
Maria Teresa was born in Kleinheubach, Kingdom of Bavaria as the second daughter of Miguel I of Portugal and Princess Adelaide of Löwenstein-Wertheim-Rosenberg.  Her father became king of Portugal in 1828 after deposing his niece Queen Maria II. He reigned until 1834 when Maria II of Portugal was restored and Miguel was forced into exile.

Described as one of the most beautiful women in Europe, Maria Theresa became the third wife of Archduke Karl Ludwig of Austria, a younger brother of the Austrian Emperor Franz Joseph I of Austria, at Kleinheubach on 23 July 1873. Despite providing him with two daughters Archduchess Maria Annunziata of Austria (1876–1961) and Archduchess Elisabeth Amalie of Austria (1878–1960), the marriage was an unhappy one due to her husband's bullying and tormenting of her. In addition to their daughters she also became the step mother to his children by his second wife, Archduke Franz Ferdinand of Austria, Archduke Otto Franz of Austria, Archduke Ferdinand Karl of Austria and Archduchess Margarete Sophie of Austria.

Maria Theresa managed to obtain considerable influence at the Austrian court when Empress Elisabeth effectively withdrew from the social scene in Vienna after the suicide of her only son, Crown Prince Rudolf, in January 1889. Maria Theresa stood in for the Empress and carried out honours at the Hofburg Imperial Palace with the Emperor until the death of her husband in 1896 when court etiquette ruled she had to go into retirement.

Widowhood

She remained such an influential figure behind the scenes at court after the death of her husband that when rumors spread that she was to marry the master of her household, Count Ladislaus Cavriani (1851-1919), no one dared to say a word against her. In the end the rumors turned out to be false. During her widowhood she spent the winter months living in Vienna and the summer months at Reichstadt castle in Bohemia.

She offered encouragement and support to her stepson Franz Ferdinand in his determination to marry Countess Sophie Chotek against his family's will. She traveled to a convent in Prague herself to fetch Sophie and took her into her own house, even pleading on Sophie's behalf with the Emperor Franz Joseph. After the union was finally permitted, Maria Theresa made all the arrangements for the wedding, insisting that it take place in her own private chapel.

She remained close to Franz Ferdinand and Sophie until their assassination in Sarajevo on 28 June 1914. It was she who broke the news of the couple's death to their children Sophie, Maximilian and Ernst. She also managed to ensure the children's financial security after telling the Emperor that if he did not grant them a yearly income, she would resign the allowance which she drew as a widow in their favour. (Most of Franz Ferdinand's property went to his nephew the Archduke Charles).

On 21 November 1916, her brother-in-law Emperor Franz Joseph died, and Archduke Karl of Austria, son of Archduke Otto Franz of Austria and nephew of Franz Ferdinand, became the new Emperor of Austria and King of Hungary. He reigned until November 1918 when the Austro-Hungarian Empire collapsed following its defeat in the First World War. After his departure from Austria (he never formally abdicated), Maria Theresa accompanied Karl and his wife Zita into exile in Madeira, but eventually returned to Vienna, where she spent the rest of her life.

In 1929, following a decline in her finances, Maria Theresa engaged two agents to sell the Napoleon Diamond Necklace, a piece inherited from her husband, in the United States. After a series of botched sales attempts, the pair finally sold the necklace for $60,000 with the aid of the great-nephew of Maria Theresa, the Archduke Leopold of Austria, Prince of Tuscany but he claimed nearly 90% of the sale price as "expenses". Maria Theresa appealed to the United States courts, ultimately resulting in the recovery of the necklace, the imprisonment of her great-nephew, and the absconding of the two agents.

Maria Theresa died in Vienna during World War II.  She survived her husband by 48 years.

Issue

Ancestry

See also

Descendants of Miguel I of Portugal

Sources

References

Austrian princesses
Austrian people of Portuguese descent
House of Braganza
1855 births
1944 deaths
Portuguese infantas
House of Habsburg
People from Kleinheubach
19th-century Portuguese people
19th-century Portuguese women
Dames of the Order of Saint Isabel
19th-century Austrian people
19th-century Austrian women
20th-century Portuguese women
Burials at the Imperial Crypt
Daughters of kings